Pelican Rapids is a city in Otter Tail County, Minnesota, United States. The population was 2,577 as of the 2020 census.

History
Pelican Rapids was platted in 1872, and named for the rapids on the Pelican River. A post office has been in operation at Pelican Rapids since 1872. Pelican Rapids was incorporated in 1882.

Geography

U.S. Highway 59 and Minnesota State Highway 108 are two of the main routes in the city.

Culture
Local landmarks include "Pelican Pete", a sculpture constructed beside the river in 1957 that is claimed to be the world's largest statue of a pelican. A survey of the state's architecture published by the University of Minnesota Press characterizes Pelican Pete as "An effective programmatic advertisement for the town, just eye-catching and outrageous enough to attract considerable attention."

In 2007, for the fiftieth anniversary of Pelican Pete's installation, the town launched a painted statue public art project wherein about three dozen smaller,  pelican sculptures were placed around town and decorated by local artists.

The O.A.E. Blyberg House is listed on the National Register of Historic Places.

Demographics

2010 census
As of the census of 2010, there were 2,464 people, 904 households, and 569 families living in the city. The racial makeup of the city was 74.1% White, 5.8% African American, 0.9% Native American, 3.2% Asian, 0.7% Pacific Islander, 11.6% from other races, and 3.7% from two or more races. Hispanic or Latino of any race were 31.5% of the population.

There were 904 households, of which 36.0% had children under the age of 18 living with them, 46.5% were married couples living together, 11.0% had a female householder with no husband present, 5.5% had a male householder with no wife present, and 37.1% were non-families. 33.0% of all households were made up of individuals, and 19% had someone living alone who was 65 years of age or older. The average household size was 2.66 and the average family size was 3.42.

The median age in the city was 35.4 years. 28.6% of residents were under the age of 18; 9.2% were between the ages of 18 and 24; 23.9% were from 25 to 44; 21.1% were from 45 to 64; and 17.1% were 65 years of age or older. The gender makeup of the city was 49.6% male and 50.4% female.

2000 census
As of the census of 2000, there were 2,374 people, 884 households, and 558 families living in the city. The racial makeup of the city was 60.43% White, 0.72% African American, 1.93% Native American, 1.58% Asian, 1.04% Pacific Islander, 6.76% from other races, and 4.54% from two or more races. Hispanic or Latino of any race were 23.59% of the population.

There were 884 households, out of which 33.1% had children under the age of 18 living with them, 50.3% were married couples living together, 7.7% had a female householder with no husband present, and 36.8% were non-families. 33.5% of all households were made up of individuals, and 19.2% had someone living alone who was 65 years of age or older.  The average household size was 2.57 and the average family size was 3.31.

In the city, the population was spread out, with 27.6% under the age of 18, 8.7% from 18 to 24, 25.2% from 25 to 44, 17.4% from 45 to 64, and 21.1% who were 65 years of age or older.  The median age was 36 years. For every 100 females, there were 97.2 males.  For every 100 females age 18 and over, there were 94.6 males.

The median income for a household in the city was $27,232, and the median income for a family was $36,970. Males had a median income of $23,750 versus $20,645 for females. The per capita income for the city was $13,699.  About 9.5% of families and 15.8% of the population were below the poverty line, including 20.4% of those under age 18 and 18.7% of those age 65 or over.

Politics

Notable people
Roy Emery Dunn - American businessman and politician
Dave Goltz - Retired Major League Baseball pitcher
Roger L. Hanson - American businessman and politician
Tucker Hibbert - Professional snowmobile racer for Team Monster Energy/Arctic Cat
Buck Paulson - American painter with a show on PBS

References

External links
City Website
Pelican Rapids Area Chamber of Commerce

Cities in Otter Tail County, Minnesota
Cities in Minnesota
Populated places established in 1872
1872 establishments in Minnesota